Seán Doherty (born 1987) is a composer, musicologist and singer from Derry, Northern Ireland.

Life
Seán Doherty was born in Derry, Northern Ireland, where he was educated at St Eugene's primary school and Lumen Christi College. He read music at St John's College, Cambridge, and was awarded a PhD from Trinity College, Dublin, on submission of a thesis entitled ‘Solfaing: The History of Four-Syllable Solmization to the Present Day’. Doherty is a lecturer in music at Dublin City University. He is a member of the acclaimed Irish choir New Dublin Voices.

Doherty has won the Feis Ceoil choral composition four times, the Choir & Organ Magazine composition competition twice, the West Cork Chamber Music Festival ‘Young Composers’ Bursary’ twice, the Jerome Hynes composition award, the St Giles’ Cathedral Edinburgh composition competition, and the Fragments composition award in association Historic Scotland. His music has been performed by the Kensington Symphony Orchestra (London), the Vanbrugh Quartet, the choir of Merton College, Oxford, the choir of Salisbury Cathedral, the Grant Park Music Festival Chorus (Chicago); the Ulster Orchestra and the Belfast Philharmonic Kids’ Choirs, the National Youth Choir of Scotland, the Mornington Singers (Dublin), Laetare Vocal Ensemble (Dublin), the Baroque violinist Claire Duff, the pianist Fiachra Garvey, and the soprano Caroline Melzer.

Doherty is a member of the Irish Composers' Collective and  the Association of Irish Composers, and is represented by the Contemporary Music Centre, Ireland.

References

External links
 Seán Doherty official website

1987 births
21st-century classical composers
Living people
Alumni of St John's College, Cambridge
Alumni of Trinity College Dublin
Academics of Dublin City University
Classical composers from Northern Ireland
Musicians from Derry (city)
21st-century male musicians